Longlands is a rural community in the Hastings District and Hawke's Bay Region of New Zealand's North Island. The area is on the southern and western outskirts of Hastings city.

The Longlands Estate occupied much of the land around 1880, but was broken up into smaller farms and a freezing works in the early 20th century.

The area is a centre for growing fruit and vegetables.

Demographics

Longlands had a population of 2,253 at the 2018 New Zealand census, an increase of 204 people (10.0%) since the 2013 census, and an increase of 162 people (7.7%) since the 2006 census. There were 762 households, comprising 1,182 males and 1,074 females, giving a sex ratio of 1.1 males per female, with 426 people (18.9%) aged under 15 years, 366 (16.2%) aged 15 to 29, 1,071 (47.5%) aged 30 to 64, and 396 (17.6%) aged 65 or older.

Ethnicities were 82.3% European/Pākehā, 20.1% Māori, 5.9% Pacific peoples, 2.9% Asian, and 2.3% other ethnicities. People may identify with more than one ethnicity.

The percentage of people born overseas was 16.6, compared with 27.1% nationally.

Although some people chose not to answer the census's question about religious affiliation, 46.5% had no religion, 43.8% were Christian, 1.6% had Māori religious beliefs, 0.3% were Hindu, 0.1% were Muslim, 0.3% were Buddhist and 1.7% had other religions.

Of those at least 15 years old, 345 (18.9%) people had a bachelor's or higher degree, and 309 (16.9%) people had no formal qualifications. 348 people (19.0%) earned over $70,000 compared to 17.2% nationally. The employment status of those at least 15 was that 1,008 (55.2%) people were employed full-time, 318 (17.4%) were part-time, and 39 (2.1%) were unemployed.

Railway station 
Longlands flag station on the Palmerston North–Gisborne Line opened in 1912, after a deputation met the Minister of Railways, following the opening of a sheep and cattle yard in 1911. The line through Longlands, from Hastings to Paki Paki, had opened on 1 January 1875, the last works being to complete the bridge over the nearby Irongate Stream, formerly the Ngaruroro River. The piles of that bridge sank soon after construction. A shelter shed was built at Longlands in 1905, to the south of Longlands Road. In 1936 Longlands was a main centre for railing cattle. In 1947 frame levers at Longlands tablet locked siding were fitted with chains, staples, and a points lock. The station closed to all traffic on 18 May 1980, but a service siding was retained for about a decade.

References 

Hastings District
Populated places in the Hawke's Bay Region